Clubiona germanica (syn. Clubiona caliginosa), is a sac spider species with Palearctic distribution.

See also 
 List of Clubionidae species

References

External links 

Clubionidae
Spiders of Europe
Palearctic spiders
Spiders described in 1932